Gerardo Enrique Silva Díaz (born 11 January 1962) is a Chilean football manager.

Career
Born in Rengo, Chile, Silva is a former amateur football player and current football manager who began his career in amateur clubs at the second half 1980s. He has coached at all categories of the Chilean football, but he is better known for getting promotion to Chilean Primera División with O'Higgins in the 2005 season and coached them again in the 2009 Clausura of the top level, replacing the Argentine coach Jorge Sampaoli.

At amateur level, he won the Campeonato Nacional de Selecciones in 1996. He also won the Campeonato Nacional de Novatos, a youth championship, with Rengo Unido in 2010.

In addition to O'Higgins, he has led many teams in Chilean football, such as Colchagua,  (also Rengo Unido), Deportes Copiapó, Deportes Puerto Montt, Malleco Unido, among others.

In 2018, he had a stint in Bolivia with Club Petrolero of the  becoming the runner-up and getting promotion to the Copa Simón Bolívar. After this season, he has been sounded out to led another Bolivian teams such as San José.

In 2022, he assumed as coach of Colchagua.

Other works
In 2006 he assumed the management of amateur football integration for the O'Higgins Region of O'Higgins FC.

As an author, he published an autobiographical book called Bendita Pasión (Blessed Passion) in November 2018.

In 2020, he served as an motivational instructor for the education department of the Municipality of Rengo, with support of psychologists, in the context of COVID-19 pandemic.

Silva works as a columnist for both digital sports media El Ágora and Primera B Chile, where he also performs as a commentator.

Personal life
He is nicknamed Yayo Silva, an affective form of Eduardo.

Honours
Rengo (city team)
 Campeonato Nacional de Selecciones: 1996

Colchagua
 Tercera División: 

Deportes Copiapó
 Tercera División: 

Rengo Unido (youth)
 Campeonato Nacional Novatos: 2010

References

External links
 Gerardo Silva at PlaymakerStats.com

1962 births
Living people
People from Rengo
Chilean football managers
Chilean Primera División managers
Primera B de Chile managers
Segunda División Profesional de Chile managers
Deportes Colchagua managers
O'Higgins F.C. managers
Deportes Copiapó managers
Chilean expatriate football managers
Chilean expatriate sportspeople in Bolivia
Expatriate football managers in Bolivia
Chilean association football commentators
Chilean writers